Guizhou or Gui Prefecture was a zhou (prefecture) in imperial China centering on modern Gaizhou, Liaoning, China. It was created during the Liao dynasty, and taken out by the succeeding Jin dynasty.

Geography
The administrative region of Guizhou in the Liao dynasty falls within modern southern Liaoning. It probably includes modern:
Under the administration of Yingkou:
Gaizhou
Under the administration of Dalian:
Wafangdian

References
 

Prefectures of the Liao dynasty
Former prefectures in Liaoning